Judith at the Banquet of Holofernes (also known as Artemisia Receiving Mausolus' Ashes and Sophonisba Receiving the Poisoned Cup) is a painting by the Dutch master Rembrandt.  It is now in the Museo del Prado in Madrid, Spain. It is signed "REMBRANDT F: 1634".

The subject of the picture was unclear for centuries. It portrays a young woman, formerly identified as Sophonisba or Artemisia, or a generic queen due to her jewels and rich garments, receiving a cup from a maiden. Today it is considered to be Judith at the banquet of Holofernes.

For the woman, Rembrandt probably used his wife Saskia as model.

References

1634 paintings
Paintings by Rembrandt
Paintings of the Museo del Prado by Dutch artists